Romance is the second studio album by Cuban-American singer and songwriter Camila Cabello. It was released on December 6, 2019, through Epic Records and Syco Music. The singer recorded the album from November 2018 to September 2019. It was produced by Frank Dukes, Louis Bell, the Monsters and the Strangerz, John Hill, Andrew Watt, and Finneas, among others. Cabello finished recording Romance on October 31, 2019, and the next day submitted the masters for the album. On November 13, Cabello announced that the album would be released on December 6, 2019. Musically, it is a pop record that contains R&B, Latin pop, and rock influences.

Romance was supported by seven singles: the double lead singles "Liar" (which peaked at number 52 on the US Billboard Hot 100) and "Shameless" (which peaked at number 60 on the same chart), "Cry for Me", "Easy", "Living Proof", "My Oh My" (featuring American rapper DaBaby) and  "First Man". The album also includes the US Hot 100 number-one single "Señorita", Cabello's duet with Canadian singer Shawn Mendes, from the deluxe edition of Mendes' self-titled third studio album (2019). The album's CD editions did not include the track "My Oh My".

Romance received generally positive reviews from music critics and debuted at number one in Canada, number three in the US, and in the top ten in several other countries including Australia, Mexico and New Zealand. To promote the album, Cabello was set to embark on The Romance Tour, starting with Europe and then North America. The album was certified platinum by the Recording Industry Association of America (RIAA) in May 2020, for selling one million album-equivalent units in the United States, becoming Cabello's second album to do so, following 2018's Camila.

Background and recording
After the release of Cabello's debut album, Camila (2018), Brian Lee and Louis Bell told MTV News that they were already looking ahead to her next project. Bell said he imagines she will work on her second album during her then-upcoming tour, saying they will send ideas back and forth from April until June when they will finally be able to get into the studio together. He wants to give the second album a "more mature progression," but ultimately, the new songs will depend on Cabello. On September 1, 2019, Cabello posted a teaser clip on her Instagram revealing the name of the album. The first installment was revealed on September 5. On October 31, 2019, she announced that the album was completed. Cabello began teasing the album's release on November 12, 2019. by posting parts of the album's cover art. Cabello formally announced the album's release the next day. On November 26, 2019, the entire standard edition of the album leaked online, just over a week before its release. Cabello revealed the album's track list on November 29, 2019. The album was released on December 6, 2019, with pre-orders beginning on November 15.
The album mainly focuses on love and Cabello wanted to focus on that for this album, Cabello immediately knew she wanted to name the album Romance. Romance was recorded in a period of 10 months between November 2018 and October 31, 2019. Cabello wrote over 80 songs for the album during this period.

Composition

Music and lyrics
Musically, Romance is a pop record with influences of R&B, Latin pop and rock. Lyrically, Cabello described the album as "sounding like what falling in love feels like". Additionally, much of the album was inspired by Cabello's relationship with Canadian singer Shawn Mendes.

Songs
The opening track of the album, "Shameless", is a power pop-punk and pop-rock song about the fear of exploring new love. "Living Proof" is a pop song about Cabello's relationship with her lover, expressed through religious imagery. "Should've Said It" is a latin-pop rock song about a former partner coming back for a second chance at love. "My Oh My" featuring DaBaby is a pop-rap, reggaeton-pop and R&B song. The song is about a fling that Cabello's family doesn't approve of. Cabello's collaboration with Mendes, "Señorita", is a latin-pop song about a couple's deep lust for one and other. "Liar" is a latin-pop song with flamenco and latin trap elements and a ska-pop chorus. The song is about romantic feelings taking over ones self. "Bad Kind of Butterflies", a pop song, is about the anxiety that comes with being in love with two people. "Easy" is a pop ballad about finding true love for the first time and how someone can help their partner love themselves. "Feel It Twice" is a ballad about rejecting a former lover. "Dream of You" is a ballad about loving somebody no matter what. "Cry for Me" is a pop-rock song about being jealous of an ex-partner. "This Love" is described as an old-school R&B-rock ballad. The song is about an indecisive lover. "Used to This" is about Cabello's first date with Mendes in San Francisco. "First Man" is a pop-rock piano ballad. Cabello wrote the song about her relationship with her dad while she is in a romantic relationship with a "good guy".

Promotion

Singles
"Shameless" and "Liar" were released on September 5, 2019, as the lead singles from the album. "Shameless" reached the top 50 in the United Kingdom, Belgium, Canada, Greece, Hungary, Ireland, Taiwan, Scotland, Singapore and Slovakia, and peaked at number 60 on the US Billboard Hot 100. Commercially, "Liar" was certified platinum on September 14, 2020, by the Recording Industry Association of America (RIAA), and it has topped the charts in Poland while reaching the top 10 in Bulgaria, Israel, Lithuania, Netherlands, and Venezuela, the top 20 in Belgium, Croatia, Estonia, Greece, Hungary, Iceland, Ireland, Latvia, Malaysia, Scotland, Singapore, Slovakia and Slovenia; as well as the top 40 in Australia, Canada, the Czech Republic, Mexico, New Zealand, Norway, Romania and the United Kingdom, and peaked at number 52 in the US. Both songs received music videos. The Henry Schofield-directed "Shameless" accompanied the songs' release and the video for "Liar" was released a week later and was directed by Dave Meyers. Cabello performed "Liar" on The Graham Norton Show on October 25, 2019.

"Cry for Me" and "Easy" were released as the third and fourth singles on October 4 and 11, 2019, respectively. Cabello performed the songs on Saturday Night Live on October 12, 2019. "Easy" peaked at number 10 and "Cry for Me" at number 15 on Billboard's Bubbling Under Hot 100 singles chart. Both songs reached the top 10 in New Zealand.

On November 15, 2019, Romance was made available for pre-orders and the single "Living Proof" was released alongside. The song was promoted with several live performances including at the 2019 American Music Awards, The Tonight Show Starring Jimmy Fallon and The Ellen DeGeneres Show. The song received a music video directed by Alan Ferguson which was released ahead of her American Music Awards performance.

"My Oh My", featuring DaBaby, was released as the album's sixth single on January 6, 2020. Cabello and DaBaby performed the song on The Tonight Show Starring Jimmy Fallon on December 12, 2019. It peaked at number 12 on the Billboard Hot 100, becoming the highest-charting single from the album in the US. Like other singles, it also received a music video. The Dave Meyers directed music video was released on February 12, 2020.  It also debuted at number 35 on the Mainstream Top 40 airplay chart, peaking at number 1, becoming her fifth song to do so. It was certified double platinum on September 14, 2020, by Recording Industry Association of America (RIAA). It also reached the top 10 in Canada, Hungary, Ireland, Israel, Mexico, Poland and Venezuela. It has been certified double platinum in Canada by Music Canada in May 2020. The single was certified Diamond in Brazil in October 2021.

"First Man" was announced as the seventh single from Romance on June 22, 2020. Cabello released its music video the previous day, coinciding with the 2020 Father's Day celebrations. Cabello performed the song live at the 62nd Grammy Awards.

Other songs 
"Señorita", Cabello's duet with Shawn Mendes released in June 2019, was originally included in the deluxe edition of Mendes' self-titled third studio album. It was later also included on Romance. "Señorita" debuted at number two on the Billboard Hot 100 on July 6, 2019. It later peaked at number one on the chart issue dated August 31, 2019 becoming Mendes' first US number-one song and Cabello's second after "Havana". Senorita has been certified platinum in 14 countries and was certified Platinum in the United States by the Recording Industry Association of America on 23 August 2019.

Tour
Cabello officially announced The Romance Tour on November 13, 2019. The tour was set to go across North America and Europe starting in May 2020, but was later postponed and then cancelled due to the ongoing COVID-19 pandemic.

Critical reception

Romance was met with generally positive reviews from critics. At Metacritic, which assigns a normalized rating out of 100 to reviews from mainstream publications, the album received a weighted average score of 71 based on 12 reviews, indicating "generally favorable reviews".

Matt Collar of AllMusic said that the album was about "Cabello feeling loved and seen by someone else" and "just as much about her seeing and understanding herself as an artist" while naming the record "compelling." Chris Willman of Variety opined that "Romance is a record that "bumps her up a level as an artist, without trying to advance her into maturity too fast. Those closing tracks do set you up, anyway, for larger leaps." He named a majority of the album's tracks as being in "good-to-great range" and that she is "proving more expressive as a singer." Adam White of The Independent considered the album a "marked improvement on the pick'n'mix anonymity of her 2018 debut", adding that while not everything works on the record, "there is an obvious through line connecting the majority of its tracks". Kitty Empire of The Guardian named the album "giddy, frisky fun but not to the point of nausea."

Writing for Rolling Stone, Lucas Villa named the album "revelatory" while feeling that Cabello deepened her songwriting on Romance. Will Hodgkinson of The Times called the record "efficient pop that maximises the froth." Irene Monokandilos of Consequence of Sound felt Cabello's "growth [was] on full display" and felt the record was at its best when in "riskier, seedier, quieter territory" but felt that she "plays it safe" and that it is "an album of mostly bark and scant bite." She ended her review by calling it "a solid, sexually charged sophomore entry that places growth at center-stage and keeps us wanting more without going limp." In a mixed review, Hannah Mylrea of NME stated that the album "shines during these more upbeat, fun moments" but "is less successful when Cabello tries to show the side of romance where you're falling head over heels or doubting a relationship." Writing for Pitchfork, Stefanie Fernández said the album "follows the same pristine pop cues" of her debut and "imbues them with a vision about love so universalized it blurs it out of focus". Fernández felt Romance "succeeds in tracks that capture love's fleeting minutiae", but the "inconsistent" production and "overproduced" songs leave "too much space where Cabello is overshadowed." Chris DeVille of Stereogum named Romance "an overall stronger album than Camila but felt it was "a lot easier to like than to love" and that it was not as "transfixing as the love that inspired it."

Neil McCormick of The Telegraph criticized the "recycling" of older songs and excessive use of auto-tune in the album, concluding that Romance is "state-of-the-art pop yet it lacks the real romance of music made from the heart." Alexis Petridis of The Guardian deemed the songwriting "so-so" and questioned the production including the "distracting" use of auto-tune "not as a special effect but as a kind of cure-all lotion slathered over every syllable that passes Cabello's lips." Chantel Ouellet of Exclaim! felt the album's "overall overproduction and focus on chasing an earworm makes it impossible to retain the authenticity found on her previous hits" while feeling that it "still relies on a structure that is becoming increasingly irrelevant, which ultimately overshadows many of the album's redeemable moments."

Commercial performance
Romance debuted and peaked at number three on the US Billboard 200 dated December 21, 2019, with 86,000 album-equivalent units, including 54,000 pure album sales, 30,000 stream-equivalent sales (resulting from 40.6 million on demand streams), and 2,000 track-equivalent sales. Romances streaming start is the third-largest streaming debut for a 2019 female pop album, behind Ariana Grande's Thank U, Next and Taylor Swift's Lover. The album's debut numbers include sales from concert ticket/album and merchandise/album bundles. The album was certified platinum by the Recording Industry Association of America (RIAA) in May 2020, for selling 1,000,000 album-equivalent units.

In Canada the album debuted at number one on Canadian Albums Chart with 14,000 total consumption units and the highest sales total for the week. The record also became Cabello's second album to do so, following 2018's Camila. It descended to number seven during its second week on the chart and stayed in the top 10 for the next four weeks. The album has been certified Platinum by Music Canada in January 2020. In the UK the album debuted and peaked at number fourteen becoming Cabello's second top twenty album there. It then fell down to number twenty-nine the following week. it has been certified Silver in the UK for selling 60,000 units.

The album reached the top ten in 11 countries including Australia, Canada, New Zealand, Mexico and the United States and the top twenty in 6 countries including the UK. Additionally, the album received a Platinum certification in Brazil for selling 40,000 units, it has been certified Gold in Mexico for selling 30,000 units and 3× Platinum in Norway.

Track listing

Notes
  signifies an additional producer
  signifies a miscellaneous producer
  signifies also a vocal producer
 "Living Proof" contains a sample of "Meter Connection", a recording by Andy Jones for The Africa Heartwood Project.
 "Liar" interpolates "All Night Long (All Night)" written by Lionel Richie and "All That She Wants" written by Jenny Berggren, Jonas Berggren, Malin Berggren and Ulf Ekberg.

Credits and personnel 
Credits adapted from AllMusic and Tidal.

Recording locations 

 London, United Kingdom – Air Edel Studios, Sarm Studios
 Birmingham, United Kingdom – Arena Birmingham
 Manchester, United Kingdom – Manchester Arena
 Partille, Sweden – Studio Borgen
 Stockholm, Sweden – House Mouse Studios
 Beverly Hills, California – Gold Tooth Music
 Los Angeles, California – Henson Recording Studios, Record Plant Recording, Westlake Recording Studios
 Nashville, Tennessee — Jordan's House

Vocals 

Camila Cabello – vocals, backing vocals
Shawn Mendes – vocals
DaBaby – featured vocals
Mattman & Robin – backing vocals
Andrew Watt – backing vocals

Instrumentation 

 Tommy Paxton Beesley – guitar
 Zara Benyounes – violin
 Benny Blanco – keyboards
 Mattias Bylund – horn, recorder
 Natalia Bonner – violin
 Meghan Cassidy – viola
 Cashmere Cat – keyboards
 Rosie Danvers – cello, strings
 Tommy Danvers – keyboards, strings
 DJ HardWerk – instrumentation
 Frank Dukes – bass guitar, percussion
 Finneas – bass, drum programming, electric guitar, piano, synthesizer
 German – instrumentation
 Sally Jackson – violin
 Peter Noos Johansson – trombone
 Patrick Kiernan – violin
 Eleanor Mathieson – violin
 Mattman & Robin – instrumentation, bass, brass, guitar, handclapping, keyboards, percussion, piano, synthesizer
 Shawn Mendes – guitar
 Steve Morris – violin
 Jane Oliver – cello
 Emma Owens – viola
 Hayley Pomfrett – violin
 Ellie Stanford – violin
 Matthew Tavares – guitar, synthesizer
 The Monsters and the Strangerz – keyboards
 Watt – guitar, keyboards, bass

Production 

 Louis Bell – production, miscellaneous production
 Benny Blanco – production
 DJ HardWerk – production
 Frank Dukes – production
 Finneas – production, vocal production
 German – production
 John Hill – production
 Carter Lang – production
 Mattman & Robin – production
 Nate Mercereau – production
 Ricky Reed – production
 Jordan Reynolds – production
 Romans – production
 Rush Hr – production
 Matthew Tavares – production
 The Monsters and the Strangerz – production
 Westen Weiss – production
 Jon Bellion – miscellaneous production
 Cashmere Cat – additional production
 Bart Schoudel – vocal production
 Gregg Golterman – production coordination
 Christian Johnson – production coordination
 Jeremy "J Boogs" Levin – production coordination
 David Silberstein – production coordination

Technical 

 Mike Bozzi – mastering
 Dave Kutch – mastering
Chris Galland – mixing, assistant engineering
 Serban Ghenea – mixing
John Hanes – mixing, engineering
Manny Marroquin – mixing
Benny Blanco – programming
Cashmere Cat – programming
DJ Hardwerk – programming
German – programming
Mattman & Robin – programming
The Monsters and the Strangerz – programming
Watt – programming
Nick Taylor – engineering
Nathaniel Alford – recording, vocal engineering
Louis Bell – recording, vocal engineering
Ryan Dulude – recording
Paul Lamalfa – recording
Dustin Park – recording
Jordan Reynolds – recording
Bart Schoudel – recording, vocal engineering
Brian Taylor – recording
Zubin Thakkar – vocal engineering

Business and design 

 Anita Marisa Boriboon – creative direction
 Amber Park – creative direction, design
 Diego L. Rodriguez – design assistant
 Bella P. Santos – design assistant
 Alana Truong – design assistant
 Amanda Charchian – photography

Charts

Weekly charts

Year-end charts

Certifications

Release history

See also
 List of number-one albums of 2019 (Canada)

References

2019 albums
Albums produced by Andrew Watt (record producer)
Albums produced by Benny Blanco
Albums produced by Cashmere Cat
Albums produced by Finneas O'Connell
Albums produced by Frank Dukes
Albums produced by Jon Bellion
Albums produced by Louis Bell
Albums produced by Mattman & Robin
Albums recorded at Westlake Recording Studios
Camila Cabello albums
Albums recorded at Henson Recording Studios